State Route 420 (SR 420) is a north–south state highway in the northwestern portion of the U.S. state of Ohio. SR 420 made its debut in the late 1960s. It is a major route whose primary purpose is to link US 20/US 23 with I-280 and the Ohio Turnpike.

Route description
For its entire length, SR 420 is a four-lane divided highway, with access provided only at three intersections along the way, and two interchanges, one at either end of the highway. There is no driveway access at any point along SR 420.

Located entirely in the northeastern portion of Wood County, SR 420 begins at a trumpet interchange with the US 20/US 23 in Troy Township and heads due north from that point. The first portion of the highway is abutted by a neighborhood of mobile homes on the west side, and a blend of woods and open field on the east side. After intersecting Truman Road, SR 420 has farmland meeting it on both sides. It then meets SR 163 and crosses into Lake Township. Continuing north, SR 420 soon passes into the midst of multiple truck stops as in approaches the Ohio Turnpike. The highway connects to these truck stops via a signalized intersection with Libbey Road. Immediately north of this intersection, SR 420 comes to an end as it arrives at the double-trumpet interchange that connects the route with the Ohio Turnpike, I-80/I-90. As SR 420 terminates, I-280 begins its northerly trek to Toledo and points north.

Consequential to its function as a major connector route, the entire length of SR 420 is included within the National Highway System.

History
The SR 420 designation was established in 1969. It was applied to what was formerly a portion of SR 120 prior to its eastern terminus being moved back to Toledo. SR 120 had formerly overlapped I-280, and then continued solo south of the Ohio Turnpike before ending at US 20/US 23.

In the fall of 2006, a new trumpet interchange was completed to facilitate the movement of traffic through the southern terminus of SR 420 where it meets the US 20/US 23 duplex.

Major intersections

References

External links

State Route 420 Endpoint Photos

420
Transportation in Wood County, Ohio